The Manly Golf Club is a golf club in Manly, New South Wales, Australia. It has hosted many events over the years, including the 1946 Australian PGA Championship and the Women's Australian Open in  1977 and 1978.

Women's Australian Open winners
1977 Jan Stephenson – 
1978 Debbie Austin –

See also

List of golf courses in New South Wales

References

External links

Manly Golf Course review, Golf Australia

Golf clubs and courses in New South Wales
Sporting clubs in Sydney
Sports venues in Sydney